The House Is Burning is the third studio album by American rapper Isaiah Rashad. It was released on July 30, 2021, by Top Dawg Entertainment and Warner Records. The album features production from numerous producers, including Devin Malik, Hollywood Cole, J. Lbs and Kenny Beats, among others. Guest appearances include frequent collaborators and labelmates Jay Rock and SZA, as well as Lil Uzi Vert, Duke Deuce, Smino, Amindi, 6lack, and others.

On November 19, 2021, the deluxe edition titled Homies Begged was released, including guest appearances from Project Pat, Juicy J, Young Nudy, and Deante' Hitchcock.

Background
Rashad first spoke of his plans for a follow-up to his second studio album The Sun's Tirade (2016) through a series of tweets in October 2017. He revealed the album's title via an Instagram Live session in May 2019, almost two years after its initial announcement. During this period, he would tease the album further, playing snippets from its recordings through various social media posts and livestreams, until April 22, 2020, when he released his first single in four years, "Why Worry", as part of a promotional event held by Top Dawg Entertainment.

Rashad spoke about what the album meant to him in an interview with Rolling Stone, saying:

In an interview with GQ, Rashad stated he wants listeners to "walk away and be like, 'Damn, he's good at making a lot of different stuff.' If you've been a part of this shit, I'd want you to be like, 'Damn, he gave me a good update on his life and he’s still giving me stuff that's going to help me during my day when I'm going through my own shit.'"

Release and promotion
In a May 2021 interview for The Fader, Rashad announced that the album was scheduled to be released sometime in June. A few days later on May 7, he released the album's lead single, "Lay wit Ya", featuring a guest appearance from rapper Duke Deuce, and accompanied by a music video directed by Omar Jones. The song's credits on digital platforms also revealed that he had signed a joint venture deal with Warner Records. On June 18, Rashad released the album's second single, "Headshots (4r da Locals)", alongside a music video for it directed by Jack Begert and Mez Heirs six days later. On July 7, Rashad revealed the album's cover art and confirmed its July 30 release date through social media.

Critical reception 

The House Is Burning received acclaim from music critics upon its release. At Metacritic, which assigns a normalized rating out of 100 to reviews from critics, the album received an average score of 82, based on 7 reviews.

Track listing

Notes
 "Darkseid" and "True Story" features additional vocals by Amindi.
 "RIP Young", "Hey Mista" and "9-3 Freestyle" features additional vocals by Kal Banx.
 "Claymore" features additional vocals by Zacari and J. Lbs.
 "Headshots (4r da Locals)" features background vocals by Nomi.
 "Don't Shoot" features additional vocals by Kal Banx, Lance Skiiiwalker and Ab-Soul.
 "HB2U" features additional vocals by Natalie Howard, Jesse Boykins III, Njomza and Lance Skiiiwalker.

Charts

Weekly charts

Year-end charts

References

2021 albums
Isaiah Rashad albums
Top Dawg Entertainment albums
Albums produced by Beat Butcha